Leslie What (born Leslie Nelson, 1955) is a writer of fantasy and literary fiction and nonfiction. She grew up in Southern California and attended Santa Ana College, and earned a certificate in Vocational Nursing.  She also attended California State University Fullerton and received her MFA in Writing from Pacific University in 2006.

She began publishing in 1992 with a story for Asimov's Science Fiction. In 1999 she won the Nebula Award for Best Short Story for The Cost of Doing Business, published in Amazing Stories.  Her story collaboration with Eileen Gunn, "Nirvana High" was nominated for the 2005 Nebula Award for Best Novelette.  She has published more than 80 short stories and essays, and her work has appeared in Parabola, Lilith Magazine, The Clackamas Review, Sci Fiction, Witpunk, Bending the Landscape, The Mammoth Book of Tales from the Road,  Midstream, Utne Reader,  Calyx, Best New Horror, and other anthologies and magazines.  Her collection "Crazy Love" was a finalist for the Oregon Book Award  Ken Kesey Fiction award in 2009.

What's father was a teenage conscript in Stalin's Red army and spent two years in a POW camp in Stuttgart. He chose the surname "Nelson" after arriving in the United States. Her mother was a German Holocaust survivor who was interned in the Riga ghetto and a series of work camps in and out of Germany.

The stories in her collection, The Sweet and Sour Tongue incorporate  "elements of science fiction and fantasy into domestic scenes of Jewish family life."  She has written about Jewish practices including the ritual bath Mikveh and preparation of the dead by the volunteer Jewish burial society (Chevra kadisha).

What worked as a licensed vocational nurse and later volunteered with the Chevra kadisha.  She lives in Portland, Oregon and was a contributing writer to the alternative newspaper, The Eugene Weekly. She is an instructor at UCLA Extension in The Writers Program (http://www.uclaextension.edu/). She was the senior nonfiction editor for "Silk Road, a literary crossroads" journal, and is a fiction editor. She is the co-editor with R. A. Rycraft of Winter Tales: Women Write About Aging from Serving House Books.

Bibliography
Sweet and Sour Tongue (2000)
Olympic Games (Tachyon Publications, 2004)
Crazy Love (2008)

References

External links
Leslie What Official Site
Interview at Strange Horizons

Interview at SFSite
Bio and Bibliography at Sci-Fiction
Interview conducted by Leslie What with Michael Chabon
Essay on Mikveh, the Ritual Bath
Nirvana High, with Eileen Gunn

1955 births
21st-century American novelists
American fantasy writers
American science fiction writers
American women short story writers
American women novelists
Living people
Nebula Award winners
Novelists from Oregon
Pacific University alumni
Women science fiction and fantasy writers
Jewish American novelists
21st-century American women writers
21st-century American short story writers
21st-century American Jews